The AMZ Żubr is an infantry mobility vehicle produced by AMZ-Kutno which is used by the Polish military. "Żubr" is also the Polish word for wisent. It was designed by AMZ-Kutno and began production in 2008. The standard Żubr variant, the Żubr MRAP, is based on the Iveco EuroCargo vehicle, which is produced in Poland.

The Żubr was designed for enhanced protection against land mines and improvised explosive devices. The vehicle's hull is V-shaped to deflect blasts. The Żubr is armored against 12.7-mm armor-piercing rounds and features a remotely controlled weapons station. The Żubr can carry 2000–5000 kg within the vehicle and can tow an additional 1500 kg. The vehicle is all wheel drive. It was designed to be and is capable of being transported by the C-130 Hercules.

Types
Żubr AWR - abandoned version of reconnaissance vehicle for Rak module, to be replaced by Rosomak AWR 8x8 reconnaissance version.
Żubr MRAP - standard troop-transporting armored car, can carry 10 fully equipped soldiers. Not produced.
Żubr WD - command vehicle, not produced.
Żubr P - Poprad variant for air defense; equipped with Grom missiles.
Żubr ZDPSR Soła - Soła PESA air surveillance variant.
Żubr ZDPSR Bystra - Bystra AESA air surveillance variant.

Operators
 - 87 in use (8 on ZDPSR Soła radar and 79 on POPRAD missile system), 17 to be delivered (ZDPSR Bystra radar).

References

External links

AMZ Kutno homepage

Armoured cars of Poland
Military vehicles introduced in the 2000s
Armoured personnel carriers of Poland
Armoured fighting vehicles of the post–Cold War period